Advanced Photo System (APS) is a discontinued film format for still photography first produced in 1996. It was marketed by Eastman Kodak under the brand name Advantix, by FujiFilm under the name Nexia, by Agfa under the name Futura and by Konica as Centuria.

Design 

The film is 24 mm wide, and has three image formats:

 H for "High Definition" (30.2 × 16.7 mm; aspect ratio 16:9; 4×7" print) (1.25 crop compared to 36x24mm full frame)
 C for "Classic" (25.1 × 16.7 mm; aspect ratio 3:2; 4×6" print)  (1.44 crop compared to 36x24mm full frame)
 P for "Panoramic" (30.2 × 9.5 mm; aspect ratio 3:1; 4×11" print)  (1.36 crop compared to 36x24mm full frame)

The "C" and "P" formats are formed by cropping the 30.2 × 16.7 mm "High Definition" image. The full image is recorded on the film, and an image recorded in one aspect ratio can be reprinted in another. The "C" format has an equivalent aspect ratio to a 135 film image. Most APS cameras (with the exception of some disposable cameras) can record all three formats; the format selection is indicated on the film by a series of exposed squares alongside the image area or recorded on the magnetic coating depending on the camera. In the absence of an operator-specified format, the machine printing an APS roll will use these indicators to determine the output format of each print.

Film and cartridge 

The film is on a polyethylene naphthalate (PEN) base, and is housed in a single-spool 39 mm long plastic cartridge. The basic diameter is 21 mm, while it measures 30 mm at the slot where the film exits. The slot is protected by a lightproof door. It is available in 40, 25 and 15 exposure lengths. The film surface has a transparent magnetic coating, and the camera uses this information exchange (IX) system for recording information about each exposure. The camera handles winding and rewinding automatically, to the extent that partially exposed films can, in certain cameras, be removed and used later. Numbered symbols (called 'visual indicators') on the cartridge end indicate the status:

 Full circle: Unexposed
 Half circle: Partly exposed
 Cross sign: Fully exposed but not processed
 Rectangle: Processed

Additionally, a tab on this end of the cartridge indicates that the cartridge has been processed.

Information exchange 

A major distinction of APS film is the ability to record information other than the image. This information exchange is most commonly used for print aspect ratio, but can also be used to record the date and time that the photograph was taken, store a caption, and record exposure data such as shutter speed and aperture setting. This information can be read by the photo printing equipment to determine the print aspect ratio, print information on the back (or, rarely, the front) of the photograph, or to improve print quality.

Two methods for storing information on the film are employed: "magnetic IX" and "optical IX". Optical IX is employed by less expensive cameras and disposable cameras, and employs a light source to expose a small section of the film, outside of the image negative area. This method is limited to determining the print aspect ratio of the finished print.

Magnetic IX is used in the more expensive cameras and allows for more information exchange. Most cameras with magnetic IX automatically record the exposure date and time on the magnetic layer, with more advanced models allowing the user to specify a predetermined caption to be printed on the photo or record the exposure settings, as well as determine print aspect ratio. Magnetic IX caused some problems for photo processors, who found their magnetic reading heads had to be cleaned frequently, or that their equipment's ability to print this information was limited.

Processing 

Unlike 135 film, processed (developed) APS film is stored in the original cartridge. For identification, every roll of APS film has a six-digit ID code on the label, which is also stored magnetically and is visible on either end of the processed negative. This ID is usually printed on the back of every individual print. This ID was designed to be an additional convenience both for the photoprocessor (who can easily match each strip of processed film with its cartridge, and each cartridge to a particular customer's order) and for the consumer, who can easily locate the correct cartridge if reprints are desired.

To facilitate automatic processing of film, a unique DX number is assigned to the different types of film.

APS film is typically processed by using a small machine to transfer the exposed APS film from the original cartridge to a reloadable one, then re-attached to the original cartridge and rewound using another machine after processing.

Cameras 

The format was introduced in 1996 by Kodak, Fujifilm, Minolta, Nikon, Canon and others. APS was mainly used for point and shoot amateur cameras, although some SLR systems were also created: Canon EOS IX, Minolta Vectis, Nikon Pronea with Nikon IX lenses. Of these the Canon EOS IX and the Nikon Pronea could use the existing 35 mm SLR lenses, whereas Minolta opted to create a new lens line-up later shared with an early digital SLR. Nikon developed the IX series of lens that were lighter and had a smaller image circle (similar to the Nikon DX format used since 2004). Although the Nikon IX series of lenses were not compatible with the Nikon 35 mm SLR, lenses for the Nikon 35 mm SLR were compatible with the Nikon Pronea. Using existing lenses meant that the field of view was reduced by around 1.6×, but had the advantage of a larger lens selection. Creating a new lens system on the other hand gave the possibility of creating smaller and lighter lenses as they had a smaller image circle to cover. APS SLR cameras were too expensive for the high-end amateur market when they first appeared, and professional photographers stuck with 35 mm cameras, which offered greater image quality and resolution.

Presently the terms APS-C and APS-H are most often used in reference to various makes of digital SLR that contain imaging sensors that are (very) roughly equivalent to their respective film dimensions given above (see Crop factor). Concurrently to their APS SLR film cameras, some manufacturers released lenses intended for use on APS film cameras - such as the Canon EF 22-55mm - which has a wider field of view to account for the relative-to-35mm crop factor. Some of these lenses have survived and are now marketed towards use on "APS" digital SLRs for the same reason. In reference to digital cameras, APS may also mean active pixel sensor, a type of CMOS image sensor.

Adoption 

The Advanced Photo System was an attempt at a major upgrade of photographic technology for amateurs, but was soon overtaken by the popularity of digital photography. Despite the added features, APS never really caught on with professional photographers because of the significantly smaller film area (58% of 135 film). Color slide film, popular with professional photographers, proved unpopular in APS format and was soon discontinued (although chromogenic black-and-white IX240 film continued to be produced). Color print film was normally available only in a limited selection of film speeds. These developments, combined with the fact that auto-loading 35mm cameras could be made almost as compact, as convenient, and as inexpensive as APS-format cameras, prevented APS from attaining greater popularity.

APS cameras found most of their success among the consumer point and shoot camera market,  but this was too little too late: within five years of the format's launch, sales had dropped significantly. This was mainly due to the increasing quality and falling prices of digital cameras.

In January 2004, Kodak announced it was ceasing APS camera production.

Both Fuji and Kodak, the last two manufacturers of APS film, discontinued production in 2011.

See also 

 Category: Film formats
 Film format
 List of color film systems
 List of film formats
 Panoramic photography

References

External links 
 Reviews and comments on APS
 Photos of disassembled APS cassette and Elph/Ixus camera

Film formats
Audiovisual introductions in 1996